Intenso Project are an English electronic music group consisting of vocalist Ben Ofoedu, DJ Rods, and Leigh Guest (from Double Trouble). On the UK Singles Chart, the band has had hits such as, Luv Da Sunshine, Your Music featuring Laura Jaye, and Get It On featuring Lisa Scott-Lee, each reaching the #22, #32, and #23 spots, respectively.

Background
The band formed after Ben Ofoedu left Phats & Small and formed a band with DJ Rods (aka Rodney Williams), who he had known since school, and Leigh Guest, a member of Double Trouble.

Their first single was "Luv Da Sunshine". It charted at #22 on the UK Singles Chart, spending just two weeks there.

Their third single, "Get It On", featured Lisa Scott-Lee and was promoted with a music video that was self-funded by Intenso and Scott-Lee, and charted at #23 on the UK Singles Chart, spending three weeks on the chart, despite being B-listed at Capital. The relative failure of this record (Scott-Lee had been dropped after producing a record that had charted at #11 on the UK Singles Chart) resulted in her taking a break from music, and the record not being featured on her solo album, Never or Now. It was also performed on Top of the Pops.

In addition, Intenso Project have provided a remix for Aaliyah's "Don't Know What to Tell Ya".

Discography

Singles

References

English house music groups